Lamin Marikong (born 14 March 1970) is a Gambian sprinter. He competed in the men's 200 metres at the 1992 Summer Olympics.

References

1970 births
Living people
Athletes (track and field) at the 1992 Summer Olympics
Gambian male sprinters
Olympic athletes of the Gambia
Athletes (track and field) at the 1990 Commonwealth Games
Commonwealth Games competitors for the Gambia
Place of birth missing (living people)